The following is a list of schools in Mexico.

Aguascalientes

Baja California

Baja California Sur

Campeche

Chiapas

Chihuahua

Coahuila
Carlos Pereyra School, Torreon
Iberoamerican University of Torreón|Iberoamerican University (Universidad Iberoamericana)
Technological Institute of La Laguna (Instituto Tecnológico de la Laguna)
Technological Institute of Saltillo (Instituto Tecnológico de Saltillo)
Monterrey Institute Of Technology and Higher Studies
Autonomous University of La Laguna
Antonio Narro Agrarian Autonomous University (UAAAN)
Autonomous University of Coahuila (Universidad Autónoma de Coahuila)

Colima

Durango

Federal District

Ciudad de México
Edron Academy
Atid School 
BridgeWay North American School 
British American School 
Churchill School & College 
Colegio Alemán Alexander von Humboldt 
Escuela Lomas Altas
Escuela Sierra Nevada
Instituto Cumbres y Rosedal Lomas
Irish Institute Mexico
Modern American School
Schweizerschule Mexico
Winpenny School
The American School Foundation
Chapultepec Heights American S.C. School 
Colegio Columbia
Colegio Junipero, A.C. 
Colegio Peterson
Colegio Rossland
Colegio Británico 
Escuela Montessori San Jerónimo 
Escuela Secundaria y Preparatoria de la Ciudad de México
Pan American Workshop
New Eton School
Maddox Academy
Escuela Lomas Altas
Greengates School
Garside School

Guanajuato
Lux Institute, Leon
Instituto Tecnológico y de Estudios Superiores de Monterrey (ITESM) 
Universidad de León (UDL)
Politécnico de Guanajuato
Universidad De La Salle Bajío
Universidad Iberoamericana
Universidad Santa Fe
Universidad de Celaya
Universidad Quetzalcóatl
Universidad Pedagógica Nacional (UPN)
Instituto Politécnico Nacional (IPN)
Unidad Profesional Interdisciplinaria de Ingeniería (UPIIUG)
Instituto Tecnológico de Celaya (ITC), Instituto Tecnológico Roque (ITR)
Instituto Tecnológico de León (ITL)
Universidad Tecnológica del Norte de Guanajuato (UTNG)
Universidad Tecnológica de León (UTL)
Universidad Tecnológica del Suroeste del Estado (UTSOE)
Universidad Tecnológica de San Miguel de Allende
Universidad Tecnológica de Salamanca
Universidad Politécnica de Guanajuato (UPG)
Universidad Politécnica de Penjamo (UPPE)
Universidad Politécnica de Juventino Rosas (UPJR)
Universidad Politécnica del Bicentenario (UPB)
Instituto Tecnológico Superior de Irapuato (ITESI)
Instituto Tecnológico Superior de Guanajuato (ITESG)
Instituto Tecnológico Superior del Sur de Guanajuato (ITSUR)
Instituto Tecnológico Superior de Salvatierra

Guerrero

Hidalgo

Jalisco

 Science Institute of Jalisco

 University of Guadalajara
 Universidad Autónoma de Guadalajara
 Instituto Tecnológico de Estudios Superiores de Occidente
 Universidad del Valle de Atemajac
 Monterrey Institute of Technology and Higher Education, Guadalajara
 Universidad Panamericana

México

Michoacán

Morelos

Nayarit

Nuevo León

San Pedro Garza García
Liceo de Monterrey

Oaxaca

Puebla

Puebla
Colegio Americano de Puebla
 East Institute of Puebla

Querétaro

Quintana Roo

San Luís Potosí

Sinaloa

Sonora

Tabasco

Tamaulipas

Tlaxcala

Veracruz

Yucatán

Anahuac Mayab University
Yucatán High School of Arts (Escuela Superior de Artes de Yucatán)
Mérida Institute of Technology (Instituto Tecnológico de Mérida)
Montejo College (Colegio Montejo)
Modelo University (Universidad Modelo)
Autonomous University of Yucatán (Universidad Autónoma de Yucatán)

Zacatecas

References